Chance of a Lifetime is a 1950 British film starring, produced, co-written and directed by Bernard Miles. Its depiction of industrial relations was seen as controversial and distributors initially refused to screen it. It was nominated for the 1951 BAFTA for Best British Film, which was awarded to The Blue Lamp.

Plot
In the times of austerity after the Second World War, Dickinson works hard to try to keep his failing agricultural implements factory going. His disgruntled workers do not appreciate his efforts, however, and resent Bland, his bullying works manager. He has a suggestion box installed after workers complain he never listens to them but, after the works manager threatens latecomers, the only response is insulting. When Bland sacks the author of the suggestion, Bolger, the workforce go on strike. Dickinson confronts them and, in the heat of the moment, tells them he works much harder than they do and dares them to run the business themselves. Baxter gets the others to take him up on his suggestion, and they elect Stevens and Morris to do just that. Dickinson is taken aback, but reluctantly agrees to let the factory to them on condition that they pay him annually 5% of the capital value of the business, equivalent to £120 a week.

Bland, Miss Cooper, Dickinson's secretary, the works manager, the foreman and a few others quit. That night, Dickinson's solicitor and doctor advise him to use the situation as an opportunity to take a holiday and recommend to Miss Cooper that she return to work.

A supplier changes its credit terms, causing a financial crisis. The local bank manager is unwilling to extend a temporary loan, so Stevens goes to the bank's head office in the City of London and speaks to the bank's managing director, Sir Robert Dysart, but without luck. Finally, Stevens and Morris put up the deeds to their own homes, Palmer raises money on his insurance policy, and, after some grumbling, some of the other workers make up the required sum.

After press publicity of this worker-owned factory, a trade delegation from the (fictitious) country of Xenobia contact the factory to arrange a demonstration of the "one-way plough" that Dickinson had been working on. Miss Cooper invites Dickinson to attend, but he merely watches from a distance. The Xenobians are impressed and order 800 ploughs for £50,000. After the contract is signed, Adam insists the only way to fulfil such a large order is to focus their efforts solely on the plough, to the exclusion of work they have contracted from longtime customers. Morris returns to the factory floor rather than be a party to abandoning their other customers, and Adam takes his place.

Meanwhile, a few of the workers, led by Baxter, are unhappy with the new, lower pay rate. Two trades union men are called in to try to sort things out, and Baxter eventually drops his objections.

Dickinson shows up at the factory late at night and is invited in for a cup of cocoa by the watchman. He meets Miss Cooper and has a chat with her about how things are going. He learns that a steel supplier is delaying delivery, so the next day he goes to see Garrett, its managing director. Garrett strongly disapproves of the experiment and refuses to help it along, but Dickinson suggests that a newspaper article about its sabotaging, with a photograph of Garrett, would not be in his best interests. The steel is delivered.

Then the Xenobian government announces that "in view of their foreign currency position, all outstanding import licences are suspended". Dickinson returns and is able to find other foreign customers for the ploughs. Disaster averted, he goes to leave, only for Stevens to offer him his old position back. Dickinson accepts a lesser position, and indicates that Adam should be the managing director. Stevens walks out, saying he prefers to do real work.

Response
The Rank and Associated British cinemas refused to show the film, claiming it was too political and "would annoy employers". The Ministry of Labour and the British Employers Confederation argued that the film would damage management-employee relations, particularly in the light of renewed industrial unrest in early 1950. The chairman of the Board of Trade, Harold Wilson, argued in cabinet that this was overreaction and the cabinet approved the film's release, using the 1948 Film Act to ensure the film was shown on the major cinema circuit.

The film was an unexpected flop at the box office. A Mass-Observation survey at the time found that only 1/3 of the people who watched the film had intended to do so, with the majority of attendees doing so 'either out of habit [in attending the cinema] or because they had nothing better to do.

Cast
Basil Radford as Dickinson
Niall MacGinnis as (Frank) Baxter
Bernard Miles as (George) Stevens
Julien Mitchell as (Ted) Morris
Kenneth More as Adam (Watson)
Geoffrey Keen as (Harry) Bolger
Josephine Wilson as Miss Cooper
John Harvey as Bland
Russell Waters as Palmer
Patrick Troughton as Kettle
Hattie Jacques as Alice
Peter Jones, Bernard Rebel and Eric Pohlmann as the Xenobians
Amy Veness as Lady Davis
Stanley Van Beers as Calvert
Norman Pierce as Franklin
Gordon McLeod as Garrett
Compton Mackenzie as Sir Robert Dysart
Nigel Fitzgerald as Pennington
Alastair Hunter as Groves (Dickinson's doctor)
Mollie Palmer as Millie
George Street as 1st Trade Union Man
Stanley Rose as 2nd Trade Union Man
Erik Chitty as Silas Pike
Leonard Sharp as Mitch
John Boddington as Bank Clerk
Hilda Fenemore, Helen Harvey, Peggy Ann Clifford, Sam Kydd, Jim Watts, Henry Bryce, Basil Cunard, Anthony Halfpenny, Howell Davies and Donald Tandy as The Workers

References

External links

 

1950 films
British black-and-white films
Films directed by Bernard Miles
1950s business films
British comedy-drama films
1950 comedy-drama films
1950s English-language films
1950s British films